Nathaniel Exum (February 28, 1940 – December 3, 2021) was an American politician from Maryland, a member of the Democratic Party and former member of the Maryland State Senate, representing Maryland's District 24 in Prince George's County.

Exum died from a lengthy illness at his home in Peppermill Village, Maryland, on December 3, 2021.

Background
Exum grew up in Memphis, Tennessee and moved to the Washington, DC area to attend Howard University. After serving in the United States Army, he became a safety director for Joseph Smith & Sons. He was active with a number of community, religious, and civic organizations, including the Kiwanis, the NAACP, and the Metropolitan African Methodist Episcopal Church. Senator Exum, 81, passed away on December 3, 2021 at his home in Prince Georges County after a lengthy illness.

In the legislature

Exum was originally elected to the House of Delegates in 1974, representing District 25 in Prince George's County. He ran for and won a seat in the State Senate in 1998, though due to redistricting he represented District 24 before being defeated. He had at various times served as Chair and Co-Chair of his county delegation, as Chaplain and Treasurer of the Legislative Black Caucus of Maryland, and was a member of the Veteran's Caucus.

References

1940 births
2021 deaths
2008 United States presidential electors
21st-century American politicians
Democratic Party Maryland state senators
Howard University alumni
Politicians from Memphis, Tennessee
Democratic Party members of the Maryland House of Delegates